Eduard Josef Gübelin (1913 – 2005) was a Swiss gemstone researcher.  

Gübelin's studies on gemstone inclusions laid the groundwork for the microscopic identification of gemstones. Gübelin used poetry to validate gemstones, as noted in the book Emeralds A Passionate Guide. 

Gubelin was one of the first gemologists to recognise the butterfly wing effect in Colombian emeralds.

He also founded Gübelin Gem Lab.

References

1913 births
2005 deaths
Gemologists
Swiss mineralogists